Rouget may refer to:

Charles Marie Benjamin Rouget (1824-1904), French physiologist
Claude Joseph Rouget de Lisle (1760-1836), French composer
Georges Rouget (1781-1869), French painter
James Rouget (1866-1924), Australian politician
Jean Rouget (1916-unknown), French field hockey player
Jean-Claude Rouget (born 1953), French horse trainer and jockey
Jean-Pierre Rouget (born 1941), French racing driver
Julio José Iglesias Rouget (born 1972), Spanish footballer

Other uses
Château Rouget, Bordeaux wine
Le Rouget, former French commune 
Rouget (grape), another name for the French wine grape Mondeuse Noire
, a French fishing trawler in service 1948-61